Human Nature is the third studio album by Australian boy band and pop vocal group Human Nature released on 1 December 2000. The album marked a change in style for the group, from the previous smooth R&B/pop sound, to a more upbeat, electronic sound, similar to contemporaries NSYNC.

Making of the album
The album was recorded just after the 2000 Summer Olympics and achieved major success all around Australia. The lead song, "He Don't Love You", was released a month earlier and was filmed at Avalon Airport. For two of their video clips, they flew to Bali (When We Were Young) and the UK (Don't Come Back).

Track listing 
"He Don't Love You" (Steve Mac, Wayne Hector) – 3:10
"Don't Come Back" (Andrew Tierney, Michael Tierney, Paul Begaud) – 3:20
"When We Were Young" (Tierney, Eliot Kennedy, Tierney, Mike Percy, Phil Burton, Tim Lever, Tim Woodcock) – 3:28
"It's Gonna Be a Long Night" (Tierney, Tierney, Gary Barlow) – 3:40
"House of Cards" (Hector, S. Ellis) – 4:22
"Everytime" (Paul Begaud, V. Corish) – 4:28
"Whisper Your Name (The Only One)" (David Kreuger, Per Magnusson, Jörgen Elofsson, Max Martin) – 3:12
"If I Only Had the Heart" (Tierney, Kennedy, Tierney, Percy, Burton, Toby Allen, Lever, Tim Woodcock)– 3:44
"Trash" (Tierney, Tierney) – 3:41
"Baby Come Back to Me" (Tierney, Tierney, Paul Begaud)– 3:32
"Angel of Your Heart" (A. Tierney, Elofsson) – 4:01
"Love Is a Fire" (Elofsson, M. Venge) – 3:12

Charts

Weekly charts

End of Year Chart

Certifications

Credits 
 A&r – John O'Donnell, Simon Moore
  Arranged [Additional] – Andrew Tierney (tracks: 2, 9, 10), Michael Tierney (tracks: 2, 9, 10)
  Creative Director – Yoon Kim
  Engineer – Ben Coombs (tracks: 3, 4, 8)
  Engineer [Assistant] – David O'Hagan (tracks: 3, 4, 8)
  Executive Producer – David Caplice
  Instruments [All] – Paul Begaud (tracks: 2, 6, 9, 10)
  Mastered – Tom Coyne (tracks: 1, 3 to 5, 7 to 12)
  Mixed – Bernard Löhr (tracks: 7, 11, 12), Paul Begaud (tracks: 2, 6, 9)
  Other [Choreography] – Kelley Abbey
  Producer – Paul Begaud (tracks: 2, 6, 9, 10), Steelworks (tracks: 3, 4, 8)
 Recorded – Matt Lovell (tracks: 2, 6, 9, 10), Paul Begaud (tracks: 2, 6, 9, 10)

References

Human Nature (band) albums
2000 albums